The Hütter Hü 211 was a German prototype long-range reconnaissance and heavy night fighter commissioned by the Reich Air Ministry in late 1944. The project stopped after an air raid destroyed the prototypes before they were finished.

Design and development
Wolfgang Hütter had been a peripheral figure in the design of German aircraft in World War II, specializing in glider construction. However, his glider expertise could usefully be employed in long-range, high-altitude aircraft, and Heinkel suggested he be involved in the modification of their He 219 aircraft for long-range reconnaissance and as a night fighter.

Hütter was asked to complete the design as quickly as possible, and borrowed heavily from the existing He 219, Junkers Ju 288 and Dornier Do 335. The only parts of new design were the wings and tail surfaces, which were constructed from wood as a weight-saving measure to enable better performance. The wings were extremely long, and resembled those of a high-performance sailplane. The cockpit was pressurized and, like the He 219, fitted with ejection seats. The finished product was meant to be delivered in February 1945 and to be able to evade British de Havilland Mosquito fighters. There were also plans for variants powered by jet engines for the purpose of achieve higher altitudes but these were never carried out.

Work was stopped after the two prototypes were destroyed by an air raid in December 1944.

Specifications

See also

References
Notes

Bibliography
 Luftwaffe Secret Projects - Ground Attack & Special Purpose Aircraft, D. Herwig & H. Rode, 

1940s German fighter aircraft
Twin-engined piston aircraft